Les Roches-de-Condrieu is a commune in the Isère department in southeastern France.

Population

Twin towns
Les Roches-de-Condrieu is twinned with:

  Cerisano, Italy, since 2009

See also
Communes of the Isère department

References

Communes of Isère
Isère communes articles needing translation from French Wikipedia